Chest is a peer-reviewed medical journal covering chest diseases and related issues, including pulmonology, cardiology, thoracic surgery, transplantation, breathing, airway diseases, and emergency medicine. The journal was established in 1935. It is the official journal of the American College of Chest Physicians which publishes the journal. The editor-in-chief is Peter Mazzone (Cleveland Clinic Respiratory Institute).

Abstracting and indexing 
The journal is abstracted and indexed in:

According to the Journal Citation Reports, the journal has a 2021 impact factor of 10.262.

References

External links 
 

Pulmonology journals
Publications established in 1935
Monthly journals
English-language journals
Academic journals published by learned and professional societies